The Naked Heart Foundation is a charity that provides children in Russia with families and safe and stimulating playspaces. It does this through creating safe and inspiring play facilities in impoverished areas, supporting foster families and families raising children with disabilities, funding NGOs that work with such families, preventing the abandonment of children in Russia, and disability awareness campaigns.

Founding
The organisation was founded in 2004 by model and actress Natalia Vodianova in response to the trauma she witnessed among children who had survived the 2004 Beslan School siege and, more generally, her perception of the importance of play for children.

Philosophy
The organisation believes  that play should be viewed as a necessity rather than a luxury and that there has been insufficient attention paid in Russia to making sure that children have safe environments in which to play. The organisation's website identifies Russian psychiatrist Lev Vygotsky as providing some motivation for the Foundation's work, and quotes him as saying, "A child's greatest achievements are possible in play, achievements that will tomorrow become his basic level of real action and morality.  It is the essence of play that a new relation is created… between situations in thought and real situations."

The play parks and playgrounds
The organisation built its first Play Park in 2006 in Nizhny Novgorod as part of its "Play with Purpose" programme. It has since built over 158 Play Parks and Playgrounds (the distinction being that the latter are smaller in size). Architect and artist Adam Kalkin provided the design for the parks' recreation centres, which are constructed using shipping containers.

Every child deserves a family
In 2011, the Naked Heart Foundation launched a new programme, called "Every Child Deserves a Family". It focuses on supporting families raising children with special needs. The Naked Heart Foundation gives financial and administrative aid to professionals working for NGOs that assist families of children who have special developmental needs. In 2011, the charity opened its first Family Support Centre in Nizhny Novgorod, where families raising children with special needs are provided free support from qualified teachers, psychologists and therapists.

The Love Ball
There have been several events to raise funds for the Foundation – most notably the Love Ball. The event is held biannually and is the main source of funding for the charity's programmes, which aim to provide help and support to disadvantaged children and their families all over Russia.

Love Ball 2008
The 2008 Love Ball in Moscow (12–14 February 2008) was organised as a three-day event culminating with the Love Ball on Valentine’s evening. The 2008 Love Ball in Moscow (12–14 February 2008) was perhaps the largest charity event in Russian history. It was held at Moscow's historic Tsaritsino Estate. Over 400 guests attended the gala dinner, including Lucy Liu; Natalie Imbruglia; Eva Herzigova; Mario Testino; Diane von Furstenberg; Andrei Shevchenko; Paolo Roversi; Alfonso Cuaron; and Rustam Tariko. There was also a charity auction that included unique lots, such as a weekend in Paris as the guest of Diane von Furstenberg, a bespoke Giorgio Armani suit with a trip to Milan and a Vogue fashion shoot with  supermodels Eva Herzigova and Natalia Vodianova.  The event raised $5 million for the Naked Heart Foundation's programmes.

Love Ball 2010
The 2010 Love Ball was held in London and supported by De Beers. The evening involved a charity auction conducted by Christie's of various pieces by De Beers and was attended by various people from the worlds of fashion, art and high society. Guests included Kate Moss, Elizabeth Hurley, Stella McCartney, Donna Karan, Joely Richardson, Mario Testino and Jade Jagger. The event raised £1.2 million for the Naked Heart Foundation, which enabled the construction of 14 new play parks and playgrounds around Russia.

Love Ball White Fairy Tale 2011
The 2011 Love Ball was a summer event held in the grounds of Valentino Garavani's 17th century  near Paris. The theme of the event was "White Fairy Tale", with most guests dressing in white or silver in keeping with the fairytale theme.

Guests included Christian Louboutin, Margherita Missoni, Olivia Palermo, Eva Herzigova, Paolo Roversi, Tommy Hilfiger, Daphne Guinness, Marc Newson, Arki Busson, Ricardo Tisci, Matthew Freud, Valentino Garavani and many others. Anne Hathaway was the hostess for the evening.
World-famous fashion designers created a unique collection of dresses that were sold as lots during the charity auction. Designers included: Agent Provocateur, Alena Akmadullina, Alexander McQueen, Alexander Wang, Balmain, Burberry, Calvin Klein, Chanel, Christopher Kane, Christian Dior, Denis Simachev, Diane von Furstenberg, Dolce and Gabbana, Franck Sorbier, Gareth Pugh, Giambattista Valli, Giles Deacon, Giorgio Armani, Givenchy, Gucci, Hussein Chalayan, Julien Macdonald, Lanvin, Louis Vuitton, Marchesa, Nina Ricci, Olivier Theyskens, Oscar de la Renta, Prada, Riccardo Tisci, Roberto Cavalli, Stella McCartney, Tsumori Chisato, Uliana Sergeenko, Valentin Yudaskin, Valentino, Vera Wang, Versace, Vika Gasinskaya, Viktor and Rolf, Vivienne Westwood, Worth, Yves Saint Laurent and Yulia Yanina.

The event raised €2.3 million.

Love Ball 2013
The 2013 Love Ball RIVIERA was held in Monte-Carlo on 27 July under the High Patronage of H.S.H. Prince Albert II and the Presidencies of H.S.H. Princess of Monaco and H.R.H. Princess of Hanover. It took place on 27 July 2013 in Monaco. The event was held with the high patronage of Albert II, Prince of Monaco, and Charlene, Princess of Monaco. The event took place in Salle Garnier of the Opéra de Monte-Carlo that was transformed specially for the event in a gorgeous dining room. The Naked Heart Foundation raised 3.2 mln euro during the charity auction.

Love Ball Arabia 2019

Love Ball Arabia held under the patronage of Her Excellency Sheikha Al Mayassa bint Hamad bin Khalifa Al Thani and Natalia Vodianova in Doha as part of the Qatar–Russia cultural exchange.
The charity gala managed to raise 7,4 million USD for both Naked Heart Foundation and Al Shafallah, thanks to generous and enthusiastic supporters including His Excellency Fahad bin Mohammed AlAttiyah, Alessandra Ambrosio, Diane von Furstenberg, Antoine Arnault, Anna Brewster, Carine Roitfeld, Cindy Bruna, Darren Criss, Elizabeth Chambers, Hailee Steinfeld, Hamish Bowles. Hans Ulrich Obrist, Imaan Hammam, Izabel Goulart, Jourdan Dunn, Maria Borges, Nicky Hilton Rothschild, Olivier Rousteing, Olivia Palermo, Caroline Scheufele, Sasha Luss, Sofia Sanchez de Betak and Stephen Jones.

History and organisation
The organisation has an office in London. The Foundation's accounts are available under its entry on the Charity Commission's website.

References

External links

Naked Heart Foundation at the Charity Commission
Official website of the Love Ball

Children's charities based in England
Charities based in Russia
Foreign charities operating in Russia
Volunteer organizations in Russia